Auguste Carrière (19 August 1838, Saint-Pierre-le-Vieux – 25 January 1902, Paris) was a linguist, grammarian and French historian, specializing in comparative grammar and Armenian culture. He was a professor at the Institut national des langues et civilisations orientales in Paris, and was an advocate of Armenian language studies, establishing an Armenian Chair at the school.

Publications 
Grammaire arménienne (1883), édition corrigée et augmentée de celle de Max Lauer 
Un ancien glossaire latin-arménien (1886)
Une version arménienne de l'histoire d'Asséneth (1886) 
La correspondance apocryphe de saint Paul et des Corinthiens, ancienne version latine et traduction du texte arménien (1891)
Moïse de Khoren et les généalogies patriarcales (1891) 
Nouvelles sources de Moïse de Khoren : Études critiques (1893) 
La légende d'Abgar dans l''' Histoire d'Arménie de Moïse de Khoren (1895) Les huit sanctuaires de l'Arménie païenne d'après Agathange et Moïse de Khoren, étude critique (1899).

 Bibliography 
 Patrick Cabanel, « Auguste Carrière », in Patrick Cabanel et André Encrevé (dir.), Dictionnaire biographique des protestants français de 1787 à nos jours'', tome 1 : A-C, Les Éditions de Paris Max Chaleil, Paris, 2015,

References 

People from Seine-Maritime
1838 births
1902 deaths
19th-century French historians
French philologists
Linguists from France
Grammarians from France
French orientalists